The 2020 season was Barcelona Sporting Club's 95th season in existence and the club's 62nd season in the top flight of Ecuadorian football. Barcelona was involved in two competitions: the main national tournament Liga Pro, and the international tournament Copa Libertadores. The national cup called Copa Ecuador was cancelled due to the COVID-19 pandemic in Ecuador.

2020 season was the first one with Carlos Alfaro Moreno as president of the club. In 2019 season, Barcelona had three different coaches, but on 17 December 2019 the club hires the Argentinean coach Fabián Bustos.

Barcelona participated in the 2020 Copa Libertadores. They began their participation from the first qualifying stage, a key they won 5-1 on aggregate against Progreso. In the second qualifying stage they beat Sporting Cristal 5-2 on aggregate. In the third qualifying phase they won 5-0 on aggregate to Cerro Porteño. However, in the group stage, Barcelona played in Group A, obtaining 5 defeats and only 1 victory, finishing last in the table and being eliminated from the tournament.

Barcelona was one of the sixteen teams disputing the 2020 Liga Pro. Barcelona finished the First stage in fourth place, but they won the Second stage, qualifying to the Finals. In the Finals, Barcelona and LDU Quito disputed the championship in round-trip matches. In the first leg, both teams tie 1-1. In the second leg, there was another tie 0-0. Barcelona won on penalties.

Season overview

January 
 Barcelona played their annual traditional friendly match called Noche Amarilla (the "Yellow Night"), in which they presented their season squad. In this friendly match, the retired Italian player Alessandro del Piero played as a special guest. The rival was Delfín SC. The match ended with a 0–1 score in favor of the visiting team.

Goalscorers

Pre-season and friendlies

Competitions

Overview

Liga Pro

First stage

Standings

Results summary

Results by round

Matches

Second stage

Standings

Results summary

Results by round

Matches

Aggregate table

Finals

Tied 1–1 on aggregate, Barcelona won on penalties and became 2020 Ecuadorian Serie A champions

Copa Ecuador 
2020 Copa Ecuador was cancelled due to the COVID-19 pandemic in Ecuador.

Copa Libertadores

First qualifying stage 

Barcelona won 5–1 on aggregate and advanced to the second stage (Match C8).

Second qualifying stage 

Barcelona won 5–2 on aggregate and advanced to the third stage (Match G1).

Third qualifying stage 

Barcelona won 5–0 on aggregate and advanced to the group stage (Group A).

Group stage (Group A)

Notes

References

External links 

Barcelona S.C. seasons